Dane Campbell (born 26 February 1983) is an Australian former professional rugby league footballer from the 2000s.

Background
Born in Brisbane, Queensland, Campbell played his junior rugby league for the Pine Rivers Bears and Redcliffe Dolphins.

He attended St Joseph's College, Nudgee before being signed by the Brisbane Broncos.

Playing career
In 2000, Campbell represented the Queensland under-17 team. In 2002, Campbell played for Redcliffe in the Queensland Cup before being signed by the North Queensland Cowboys. In 2004, he joined the Easts Tigers, starting at halfback in their Grand Final loss to the Burleigh Bears.

In 2005, Campbell signed with the Newcastle Knights. In Round 9 of the 2005 NRL season, he made his NRL debut in the Knights' 2–32 loss to the Sydney Roosters. He played six games for the club, kicking six goals, before departing at the end of the season.

After leaving the Knights, Campbell served as player-coach of the Noosa Pirates before retiring as a player in 2010 due to a head injury.

Post-playing career
In 2004, while still an active player, Campbell helped establish the West Indies national rugby league team, who played one international game against South Africa. This subsequently led to the formation of the Jamaica Rugby League Association and the Jamaica national rugby league team.

In 2010, he took over as owner and chief administrator of Hurricanes Rugby League, a rugby league team based in Jamaica.

In 2011, Campbell became one of the founders of the Vanuatu national rugby league team. On 20 October 2012, he coached the side in their first international, a 14–26 loss to Greece in Port Vila.

In 2016, he joined the Melbourne Storm as a recruitment officer and pathways manager. In November 2020, Campbell left the Storm, joining the North Queensland Cowboys as a recruitment officer.

References

1983 births
Living people
Australian rugby league administrators
Australian rugby league coaches
Australian rugby league players
Eastern Suburbs Tigers players
Hurricanes Rugby League
Newcastle Knights players
Redcliffe Dolphins players
Rugby league players from Brisbane
Rugby league halfbacks
Vanuatu national rugby league team coaches